Reinhard Lettmann (9 March 1933 – 16 April 2013) was the Roman Catholic bishop of the Diocese of Münster, Germany.

Ordained to the priesthood in 1959, Lettmann was named bishop in 1973 and retired in 2008.

References

1933 births
2013 deaths
Roman Catholic bishops of Münster
20th-century German Roman Catholic bishops
21st-century German Roman Catholic bishops
People from Datteln
20th-century German Roman Catholic priests
21st-century Roman Catholic bishops in Germany